The 1995 Hong Kong Legislative Council election for members of the Legislative Council of Hong Kong (LegCo) was held on 17 September 1995. It was the first, and only, fully elected legislative election in the colonial period before transferring Hong Kong's sovereignty to China two years later. The elections returned 20 members from directly elected geographical constituencies, 30 members from indirectly elected functional constituencies, and 10 members from elections committee constituency who were elected by all District Board members.

In consequence of Governor Chris Patten's constitutional reforms, which were strongly opposed by the Beijing government, the nine newly created functional constituencies enfranchised around 2.7 million new voters. As the tensions between Britain and China went on, Hong Kong became rapidly politicised. Party politics was getting in shape as the Beijing-loyalist Democratic Alliance for the Betterment of Hong Kong (DAB), the pro-business Liberal Party, the pro-democracy Democratic Party and the middle-class and professional oriented Hong Kong Progressive Alliance (HKPA) were set up and filled their candidates in the election.

The pro-democracy forces won another landslide victory after the 1991 Legislative Council elections, sweeping 16 of the 20 directly elected seats in which the Democratic Party alone took 12 directly elected seats. The Democrats returned to the legislature with a total number of 19 seats, far ahead of the Liberal Party's 10, the DAB 6 and the pro-democracy Association for Democracy and People's Livelihood's (ADPL) 4 seats. ADPL young candidate Bruce Liu also defeated DAB chairman Tsang Yok-sing in Kowloon Central, along with many other DAB main candidates being defeated by pro-democrats.

The pro-democrats controlled about half of the seats in the legislature and supported moderate Andrew Wong to become President of the Legislative Council. Since Beijing overthrew the promise of "through train" which guaranteed the legislature could travel through 1997 as the reaction to Chris Patten's reform, the legislature lasted for only 21 months and was replaced by the Beijing-controlled Provisional Legislative Council after the handover of Hong Kong, becoming the only pro-democracy legislature in history.

Background

The electoral bases were largely expanded under the 1994 Hong Kong electoral reform carried out by the last colonial governor Chris Patten as the last step of democratisation as following:
 Using the "single seat, single constituency" method for all three tiers of geographical constituency elections to the District Boards, Municipal Councils (Urban and Regional Council) and Legislative Council;
 Lowering the minimum voting age from 21 to 18;
 Abolishing all appointed seats on the District Boards and Municipal Councils;
 Removing all the restrictions on local deletes to China's National People's Congress to stand for election;
 Broadening the franchise of certain existing functional constituencies by replacing corporate voting with individual voting;
 Introducing nine new functional constituency seats; and 
 The introduction of an Election Committee of District Board members, which would return 10 members to the Legislative Council using the single transferable vote.

New nine functional constituencies with much larger eligible electorates was created to broaden the franchise to 2.7 million new voters:
 Primary Production, Power and Construction
 Textiles and Garment
 Manufacturing
 Import and Export
 Wholesale and Retail
 Hotels and Catering
 Transport and Communication
 Financing, Insurance, Real Estate and Business Services
 Community, Social and Personal Services

Overview
The United Democrats of Hong Kong and the Meeting Point, the two major pro-democracy forces had merged into the Democratic Party in 1994, while the pro-business legislators had formed the Liberal Party in 1993 and the pro-Chinese government politicians established the Democratic Alliance for the Betterment of Hong Kong (DAB), today's largest political party.

Solicitor Ambrose Lau, in the direction of the New China News Agency founded the Hong Kong Progressive Alliance which consisted of mostly pro-business factor of the CCP's united front. Other grassroots leaders were also encouraged by the CCP to stand in the election against the pro-democracy camp.

Succeeding the last election in 1991, Democratic Party, together with other smaller parties, groups and independents in the pro-democracy camp, had another landslide victory again, getting 16 of the 20 geographical constituency seats. Allen Lee, the Chairman of the Liberal Party and the Appointed Member in the LegCo got elected in the geographical constituency direct election. The Chairman of the DAB, Tsang Yok-sing however got defeated by Bruce Liu of pro-democracy Association for Democracy and People's Livelihood in Kowloon Central.

The Government of the People's Republic of China overthrew the promise of the "through train" (letting the members elected in the 1995 election travel safely through 1997 and beyond) and set up the Provisional Legislative Council in 1996, after the proposal package of electoral changes for the 1995 Legislative Council elections that was deemed unconstitutional by the PRC was passed in the Legislative Council.

General outcome

|-
! style="background-color:#E9E9E9;text-align:center;" rowspan=2 colspan=3 |Political Affiliation
! style="background-color:#E9E9E9;text-align:right;" colspan=3 |Geographicalconstituencies
! style="background-color:#E9E9E9;text-align:right;" colspan=3 |Functionalconstituencies
! style="background-color:#E9E9E9;text-align:right;" rowspan=2 |ElectionCommitteeseats
! style="background-color:#E9E9E9;text-align:right;" rowspan=2 |Totalseats
|-
! style="background-color:#E9E9E9;text-align:right;" |Votes
! style="background-color:#E9E9E9;text-align:right;" |%
! style="background-color:#E9E9E9;text-align:right;" |Seats
! style="background-color:#E9E9E9;text-align:right;" |Votes
! style="background-color:#E9E9E9;text-align:right;" |%
! style="background-color:#E9E9E9;text-align:right;" |Seats
|-
| width=1px rowspan=6 style="background-color:LightGreen;border-bottom-style:hidden;"|
| width=1px style="background-color: " |
| style="text-align:left;" |Democratic Party 
|385,428
|42.26
|12
|62,907
|14.47
|5
|2
|19
|-
| width=1px style="background-color: " |
| style="text-align:left;" |Hong Kong Association for Democracy and People's Livelihood 
|87,072
|9.55
|2
|−
|−
|1
|1
|4
|-
| width=1px style="background-color: " |
| style="text-align:left;" |Hong Kong Confederation of Trade Unions 
|−
|−
|−
|42,565
|9.79
|1
|−
|1
|-
| width=1px style="background-color:Black" |
| style="text-align:left;" |United Ants
|18,551
|2.03
|0
|−
|−
|−
|−
|0
|-
| width=1px style="background-color:green" |
| style="text-align:left;" |Democratic Labour Alliance 
|−
|−
|−
|33,596
|7.73
|0
|−
|0
|-
|style="background-color:"|
| style="text-align:left;" |Independent and others 
|66,464
|7.29
|2
|60,602
|13.94
|3
|0
|5
|-
|-style="background-color:LightGreen"
| style="text-align:left;" colspan=3 |Total for pro-democracy camp
|557,515
|61.13
|16
|199,670
|45.93
|10
|3
|29
|-
|rowspan=7 style="background-color:Pink;border-bottom-style:hidden;"|
| width=1px style="background-color: " |
| style="text-align:left;" |Liberal Party 
|15,216
|1.67
|1
|74,355
|17.10
|9
|0
|10
|-
| width=1px style="background-color: " |
| style="text-align:left;" |Democratic Alliance for the Betterment of Hong Kong 
|142,801
|15.66
|2
|42,767
|9.84
|2
|2
|6
|-
| width=1px style="background-color: " |
| style="text-align:left;" |Hong Kong Progressive Alliance 
|25,964
|2.85
|0
|–
|–
|–
|1
|1
|-
|style="background-color:"|
| style="text-align:left;" |Liberal Democratic Federation of Hong Kong 
|11,572
|1.27
|0
|4,986
|1.15
|0
|1
|1
|-
|style="background-color:"|
| style="text-align:left;" | Hong Kong Federation of Trade Unions
|−
|−
|−
|21,836
|5.02
|1
|−
|1
|-
|style="background-color:"|
| style="text-align:left;" | New Hong Kong Alliance
|−
|−
|−
|−
|−
|1
|−
|1
|-
|style="background-color:"|
| style="text-align:left;" |Independent and others 
|90,495
|9.92
|0
|64,499
|14.84
|4
|1
|5
|-
|-style="background-color:Pink"
| style="text-align:left;" colspan=3 |Total for pro-Beijing parties
|286,048
|31.37
|3
|208,443
|41.34
|16
|5
|24
|-
|style="background-color:"|
| style="text-align:left;" colspan=2 | Federation of Hong Kong and Kowloon Labour Unions
|−
|−
|−
|533
|0.12
|1
|−
|1
|-
| width=1px style="background-color: " |
| style="text-align:left;" colspan=2 |123 Democratic Alliance 
|−
|−
|−
|−
|−
|−
|1
|1
|-
| width=1px style="background-color: " |
| style="text-align:left;" colspan=2 |Civil Force
|27,841
|3.05
|0
|–
|–
|–
|0
|0
|-
|style="background-color:"|
| style="text-align:left;" colspan=2 |Hong Kong Alliance of Chinese and Expatriates
|3,979
|0.44
|0
|−
|−
|−
|−
|0
|-
|style="background-color:red"|
| style="text-align:left;" colspan=2 |Pioneer
|2,594
|0.28
|0
|−
|−
|−
|−
|0
|-
|style="background-color:"|
| style="text-align:left;" colspan=2 |Hong Kong and Kowloon Trades Union Council
|−
|−
|−
|262
|0.06
|0
|−
|0
|-
|style="background-color:"|
| style="text-align:left;" colspan=2 |Non-affiliated Independent and others 
|33,974
|3.73
|1
|25,798
|5.93
|3
|1
|5
|-
|style="text-align:left;background-color:#E9E9E9" colspan="3"|Total (turnout 35.80%)
|width="75" style="text-align:right;background-color:#E9E9E9"|911,951
|width="30" style="text-align:right;background-color:#E9E9E9"|100.00
|style="text-align:right;background-color:#E9E9E9"|20
|width="75" style="text-align:right;background-color:#E9E9E9"|434,706
|width="30" style="text-align:right;background-color:#E9E9E9"|100.00
|style="text-align:right;background-color:#E9E9E9"|30
|style="text-align:right;background-color:#E9E9E9"|10
|width="30" style="text-align:right;background-color:#E9E9E9"|60 
|}

Vote summary

Seat summary

Result breakdown

Geographical Constituencies

Functional Constituencies

Election Committee Constituency

References

Hong Kong legislative election
Legislative election
Legislative
1995 elections in British Overseas Territories
Hong Kong legislative election